Willmer L. Fowler (born June 3, 1937) is a former American football player who played with the Buffalo Bills. He played college football at Northwestern University.

Drafted, but not signed by the Philadelphia Eagles, Fowler caught on with the Bills in the American Football League, where he made their inaugural roster and became the team's starting halfback, becoming the first Bill to rush for 100 yards in a single game. A ruptured Achilles tendon in 1961 ended his playing career.

Fowler served in the National Guard from 1960 to 1981, retiring with the rank of captain. He also worked for IBM, and, until his retirement in 2017, was the director of the Erie County pistol permit office.

References

1937 births
Living people
American football halfbacks
Northwestern Wildcats football players
Buffalo Bills players
Players of American football from Alabama
People from Andalusia, Alabama
American Football League players